This is a list of Melges 20 sailboat championships.

World Championships

References

Melges 20